Events from the year 1880 in the United Kingdom.

Incumbents
 Monarch – Victoria
 Prime Minister – Benjamin Disraeli (Conservative) (until 21 April), William Ewart Gladstone (Liberal) (starting 23 April)
 Parliament – 21st (until 24 March), 22nd (starting 29 April)

Events
 January–March – great fog continues to engulf London.
 21 January – an underground firedamp explosion at Fair Lady Pit, Leycett, in the North Staffordshire Coalfield, kills 62 coal miners.
 31 January – training frigate HMS Atalanta leaves Bermuda bound for Falmouth but is lost in the Atlantic with all 281 on board.
 2 February – the first successful shipment of frozen mutton from Australia arrives in London aboard the SS Strathleven.
 8 March – the Conservative Party lose the general election to the Liberal Party.
 19 March – Rev. Sidney Faithorn Green is imprisoned for over 2 years in Lancaster Castle and will be deprived of his parish in Manchester as a result of proceedings under the Public Worship Regulation Act 1874. 
 3 April – Gilbert and Sullivan's comic opera The Pirates of Penzance has its London debut at the Opera Comique on the Strand.
 18 April – William Ewart Gladstone succeeds Benjamin Disraeli as Prime Minister. This is Gladstone's second term as Prime Minister.
 19 April – Second Anglo-Afghan War: British victory at the Battle of Ahmed Khel.
 20 April – Victoria University chartered and incorporates Owens College, Manchester.
 20 May – foundation stone laid for Truro Cathedral in Cornwall, the first to be built on a new site since the 13th century.
 15 July – an underground firedamp explosion at Risca Colliery in the Crosskeys district of Monmouthshire kills 120 coal miners and 69 horses.
 27 July – Second Anglo-Afghan War: Afghan victory at the Battle of Maiwand.
 2 August – Time in the United Kingdom: Greenwich Mean Time adopted as the legal standard throughout Great Britain by the Statutes (Definition of Time) Act.
 26 August – Elementary Education Act ("Mundella's Act") enforces school attendance up to the age of ten in England and Wales.
 1 September – Second Anglo-Afghan War: British victory at the Battle of Kandahar.
 6–8 September – first cricket Test match held in Britain.
 8 September – an underground explosion at Seaham Colliery, County Durham, kills 164 coal miners.
 October – Irish tenants ostracise landholder's agent Charles Boycott.
 29 October – Wells lifeboat disaster: RNLI life-boat Eliza Adams of Wells-next-the-Sea, Norfolk, capsizes on service; 11 of 13 crew lost.
 17 November – the University of London awards the first degrees to women.
 27 November – Rev. Richard Enraght is imprisoned for 49 days in Warwick Prison and deprived of his parish in Birmingham as a result of proceedings under the Public Worship Regulation Act 1874.
 10 December – an underground firedamp explosion at Naval Steam Colliery, Penygraig, in the Rhondda, kills 101 coal miners.
 15 December – first performance of a play by Henrik Ibsen in English, The Pillars of Society (under the title Quicksands) at the Gaiety Theatre, London.
 16 December
 High Court of Justice reorganised into the Chancery, Queen's Bench and the Probate, Divorce and Admiralty Divisions, with abolition of the Common Pleas and Exchequer Divisions.
 The Boers declare independence in Transvaal triggering the First Boer War.
 20 December – First Boer War: British forces defeated in the action at Bronkhorstspruit.
 24 December – first festival of Nine Lessons and Carols devised by Edward White Benson, at this time Bishop of Truro.

Undated
 Foundation of the David Greig provision merchant chain in London.
 A. & R. Scott begin producing the predecessor of Scott's Porage Oats in Scotland.

Publications
 Benjamin Disraeli's novel Endymion.
 Amelia Edwards' novel Lord Brackenbury.
 Thomas Hardy's novel The Trumpet-Major.

Births
 28 January – Herbert Strudwick, cricketer (died 1970)
 8 February – Arthur Greenwood, politician (died 1954)
 17 February – Reginald Farrer, botanist (died 1920)
 1 March – Lytton Strachey, biographer and critic, member of the Bloomsbury Group (died 1932)
 6 March – Jameson Adams, Antarctic explorer, Royal Navy officer and civil servant (died 1962)
 17 April – Leonard Woolley, archaeologist (died 1960)
 30 April – Charles Exeter Devereux Crombie, cartoonist (died 1967)
 25 May – Alf Common, footballer (died 1946)
 21 June – Josiah Stamp, 1st Baron Stamp, economist (died 1941)
 12 August – Radclyffe Hall, author and poet (died 1943)
 13 August – Mary Macarthur, trade unionist (died 1921)
 23 August – Wyndham Standing, English actor (died 1963)
 16 September – Alfred Noyes, poet (died 1958)
 22 September – Christabel Pankhurst, suffragette (died 1958)
 23 September – John Boyd Orr, physician and biologist, recipient of the Nobel Peace Prize (died 1971)
 15 October – Marie Stopes, birth control advocate, suffragette and palaeontologist (died 1958)
 28 October – Saxon Sydney-Turner, civil servant, eccentric, member of the Bloomsbury Group (died 1962)
 2 November – John Foulds, classical music composer (died 1939)
 9 November – Giles Gilbert Scott, architect (died 1960)
 10 November – Jacob Epstein, American-born sculptor (died 1959)
 25 November – Elsie J. Oxenham, children's novelist (died 1960)

Deaths
 27 January – Edward Middleton Barry, architect (born 1830)
 2 February – Sir George Hamilton Seymour, diplomat (born 1797)
 3 April – John Laing, bibliographer and Free Church of Scotland minister (born 1809)
 12 April – Joseph Brown, Roman Catholic bishop (born 1796)
 6 May – Charles Meredith, Welsh-born politician in Tasmania (born 1811)
 30 May – James Planché, dramatist (born 1796)
 12 July – Tom Taylor, dramatist and journalist (born 1817)
 15 August – Adelaide Neilson, actress (born 1848)
 22 August – Benjamin Ferrey, architect (born 1810)	
 9 September – Charles Lowder, Anglican priest prominent in Anglo-Catholicism and humanitarian (born 1820)
 18 September – Sir Fitzroy Kelly, lawyer and politician, last Chief Baron of the Exchequer (born 1796)
 23 September – Geraldine Jewsbury, novelist and woman of letters (born 1812)
 25 September – John Tarleton, admiral (born 1811)
 5 October – William Lassell, astronomer (born 1799)
 30 November – Jeanette Threlfall, hymnwriter (born 1821)
 22 December – George Eliot (Mary Ann Cross), novelist and woman of letters (born 1819)
 31 December – John Stenhouse, Scottish chemist (born 1809)

References

 
 Years of the 19th century in the United Kingdom